Beshtasheni is a village near Tsalka in southern Georgia's Kvemo Kartli region.
Almost all the population are Greeks. This Pontian Greeks are also known as Tsalka Urums.

See also
Kvemo Kartli
Tsalka
Pontic Greeks
Urums

See also
Google Earth community map
  Geo-links for Beshtasheni

References

Populated places in Kvemo Kartli
Pontic Greeks
Tiflis Governorate